The castra of Cornuțel was a fort in the Roman province of Dacia. It was erected in the 2nd century AD. The ruins of a nearby contemporary settlement were also unearthed. The castra and the settlement were abandoned in the 3rd century AD. The ruins of the fort are located in Cornuţel (commune Păltiniș, Romania).

See also
List of castra

Notes

External links
Roman castra from Romania - Google Maps / Earth

Roman legionary fortresses in Romania
History of Banat
Historic monuments in Caraș-Severin County